World of Tomorrow or Worlds of Tomorrow may refer to:

 Worlds of Tomorrow, science fiction anthology series
 Worlds of Tomorrow (magazine), science fiction magazine
 World of Tomorrow (film), short film series
 World of Tomorrow, the fictional setting in the Sky Captain and the World of Tomorrow
 "The world of tomorrow", motto of the 1939 New York World's Fair

See also
 2099: World of Tomorrow, a comic book series by Marvel Comics
 The World Tomorrow (disambiguation)
 Tomorrow's World (disambiguation)
 Tomorrow, the World! (1944 film)
 Future World (disambiguation)